Kuruch (Russian: Куруч) may refer to
Kuruch-Karan, a rural locality (selo) in Bashkortostan, Russia
Kuruj Kollan (also Kūrūch Kollān), a village in Iran
Rimma Kuruch (1938–2019), Russian language educator